Solovey (Соловей, The Nightingale) is a Russian-language art song by Russian composer Alexander Alyabyev (1787-1851) based on the poem Russkaya pesnya by Anton Delvig. It was composed while Alyabyev was in prison, in 1826. The song is a showpiece for coloratura sopranos and is the only work of Alyabyev to become part of the standard performance repertory.

Text and composition
The poem itself was probably developed by Delvig during the summer of 1825 from the words to a folk-song melody, as were many of the poems in his Russian Melodies. Alyabyev did not know baron Delvig, so probably encountered the poem as printed as "Russian Melody no.6" in the second volume of Delvig and Pushkin's almanac Northern Flowers, which was approved for printing by the censor 26 February 1826. Accounts of the composition of the song vary - one has it that the composer had his piano delivered to his damp cell.

Соловей мой, соловей, Голосистый соловей! Ты куда, куда летишь, Где всю ночку пропоешь?
Nightingale, my nightingale, Vociferous nightingale! Where, where are you flying to,

Performance in Russia
Due to the composer's imprisonment, and then exile in Tobolsk, the exact circumstances of the song's first performances are unclear. Whatever the case the song quickly became known in the salons of St Petersburg, which would likely include being performed in the salon of Delvig's own wife where singers such as the tenor N.K. Ivanov premiered new works. On January 7, 1827, the romance was performed from the stage of the Bolshoi Theater in Moscow. Having been textually drawn from folk-song material, and the setting by Alyabyev very emphatically playing on folk elements, and being playable by amateurs, the song gradually acquired folk song status.

Reception in the West
The song became one of the earliest Russian art songs to become widely known in Western Europe. The song became known outside Russia after known after Pauline Viardot introduced it into Rosina's singing lesson scene in Gioachino Rossini's The Barber of Seville. In this she was followed by the Italian soprano Adelina Patti and Marcella Sembrich and others. By the early years of the Twentieth Century the song had become a popular choice to showcase singers who would add their own cadenzas to ornament the melody. Well known vocal pedagogue Estelle Liebling wrote an English language adaptation of the song which was published under the title "The Russian Nightingale" in 1928. That translation has been used widely in the United States.

Adaptions by other composers
Mikhail Glinka wrote piano variations based on the song while studying with Dehn.
Mily Balakirev also wrote piano variations on the song.
Franz Liszt made a transcription of the song (S. 250/1).

No other composer set the Delvig poem after Alyabyev. "Solovey" Op60. No.4 by Tchaikovsky is a setting not of the Delvig poem but of a different, and more complex, poem by Pushkin.

Selected recordings
Olimpia Boronat, 1908
Antonina Nezhdanova, 1908
Rita Streich, in Russian with RIAS-Orchestra with Kurt Gaebel 1954
Natalie Dessay, in Russian with Berliner Sinfonie-Orchester, Michael Schønwandt EMI 1998

References

1826 songs
Russian songs
Art songs
Russian-language songs
Music about nightingales